Pseudomonas extremorientalis is a Gram-negative, saprotrophic, fluorescent bacterium found in a drinking water reservoir near Vladivostok City, Russia. The type strain is LMG 19695.

References

External links
Type strain of Pseudomonas extremorientalis at BacDive -  the Bacterial Diversity Metadatabase

Pseudomonadales
Bacteria described in 2002